Lixnaw is a village in North County Kerry, Ireland. It is located near the River Brick  SW of Listowel and  NE of Tralee.

History 
Lixnaw was once the seat of the Fitzmaurice family, the Earls of Kerry. In 1320 Nicolas, the third baron of Lixnaw erected the Castle of Lixnaw, built the old bridge, and improved the village. In 1600 Charles Wilmot and his forces garrisoned the castle and established it as their centre of operations. It was subsequently retaken by Lord Kerry who entrusted its defence to his brother Gerald, who was eventually forced to surrender the castle due to a shortage of water. Today, nothing remains of the Castle of Lixnaw. An interesting point about the Earls of Kerry is that one of the descendants William Petty, 2nd Earl of Shelburne, who was born in Dublin but was largely reared in Lixnaw (except when he was in Eton), became British Prime Minister in 1782. Later Lansdowne Road in Dublin was named after him, which lent its name to the rugby stadium.

Lixnaw is situated near the River Brick over which there were originally two stone bridges, from which the village got its name.

Places of interest

Korean War Memorial 
Erected to honour the Irish soldiers who died in the Korean War. A total of twenty-nine Irishmen died while serving under conscription in the US Army under the banner of the UN from 1950-1953.

St. Michael's Church 

St. Michael's Church is a Roman Catholic church designed by Irish architect J. J. McCarthy, but more Norman than Celtic in design, due to having to flank the nave with aisles that open off it through round-arched arcades. It has a modernised interior.

Other local features 
St. Michael's Holy Well features a statue depicting St. Michael defeating Satan. Tonaknock Cross is an early high cross which is located approximately 6 km away.

Transport 
Lixnaw railway station opened on 20 December 1880, closed for passenger traffic on 4 February 1963, closed for goods traffic on 2 December 1974 and finally closed altogether on 11 June 1983.

Sport
The local GAA club, Lixnaw GAA, have won the Kerry Senior Hurling Championship on nine occasions, most recently in 2018.  Well-known Lixnaw players include Paul Galvin and Éamonn Fitzmaurice.

See also 
 List of towns and villages in Ireland

References 

Towns and villages in County Kerry